Millettia extensa is a species of flowering plant in the family Fabaceae, native to the Indian Subcontinent and Southeast Asia. A woody climber, local peoples use it as a supplemental forage and for various veterinary treatments for their livestock.

References

extensa
Flora of the Indian subcontinent
Flora of Indo-China
Plants described in 1876